'Catherine Cole is an Australian author and academic.  She lives between Australia, South West France and the UK  Cole's work in the fields of fiction, poetry, non-fiction and academic writing has been widely published both in Australia in the UK, US, China and Vietnam. Her writing has won, been shortlisted or commended in a range of awards including The Munster Poetry Prize; The Elizabeth Jolley Short Story Prize;  Davitt Award for Australian Crime Writing; The Ned Kelly Award; The Peter Blazey Prize for Non-Fiction Manuscript; and The Asher Award Melbourne University 2005 award. Cole also has judged some of Australia's leading writing prizes including the Age Book of the Year; The Barbara Jefferis Award; and The National Jazz Writing Competition.

As a professor of creative writing at both the University of Wollongong and RMIT University, Melbourne and as a senior lecturer at University of Technology, Sydney, Cole has supervised some of Australia's leading and emerging writers in their postgraduate degrees.

Literary career
Cole began her literary career publishing poetry in a range of Australian poetry journals with the support of her mentor, A.D. Hope- whom she later wrote about in her memoir, The Poet Who Forgot (2008). Her first published prose fiction was short story, followed by the novels Dry Dock  (1999), Skin Deep (2005) and then The Grave at Thu Le (2006) which examines French colonialism in Vietnam.

Cole's Private Dicks and Feisty Chicks explores the lure of crime fiction and its increasing popularity across international cultures and was published in 1996.

Her lifelong fascination with Vietnam was further explored in the anthology, The Perfume River– Writing from Vietnam (2010).

Cole, along with Vicki Karaminas and Peter McNeil co-edited Fashion in Fiction, Fashion in Textiles, Television and Film (2009).

Some of Cole's recent short stories have been published in leading Australian journals and anthologies (see list of works below); and have been produced by and read on BBC Radio 4.

List of works

Novels 
Sleep

Dry Dock

The Grave at Thu Le

Skin Deep

Short stories
Seabirds Crying in the Harbour – collection of stories

The Rabbit  2014  Animal Studies Journal, 3 (2)

Dein ist Mein Ganzes Hertz  2014 Sleepers Almanac #9

Mother Love  2014 InC. Kennedy (Eds.) Australian Love Stories

Home 家  2012 总第345期，年第6期 345 ed. Beijing 北京: World Literature 世界文学; The Best Australian Short Stories 2011; and in Meanjin  2010 #69 

Long Live Peace  2010 The Perfume River: An Anthology of Writing From Vietnam

Her Annotated Hair  2009 Trunk: Hair #1

Poetry 
War A Mascara Literary Review, Issue 17 – April 2015

Animal Dreaming Animal Studies Journal. 2 ed. Sydney: Animal Studies Journal, 2013

Carlton Online: Mascara Literary Review, Issue 13, June, 2013 1-2

Jim Morrison - Pere Lachaise "A séance"  Tincture. 3 ed. Sydney: Tincture, 2013 4

Leda (vol.6, no.1) Transnational Literature. Adelaide: Flinders University, 2013

Looking for Serge Gainsbourg Online: Mascara Literary Review, Issue 13, June, 2013 1-2

Memoir 
The Poet Who Forgot

Academic writing
Private Dicks and Feisty Chicks: An Interrogation of Crime Fiction

Essays and reviews
Diverse Voices in Celebration of Poetry Text : Journal of Writing and Writing Courses  April vol.18 #1 2014

Review: Nam Le's "The Boat" 2013 Reading Australia

Review: "Konkretion" by Marion May Campbell Mascara Literary Review #13 2013

Productive creative writers' relationships: a communities-of-practice framework Nelson, A. & Cole, C.  New Writing: the international journal for the practice and theory of creative writing 9 #3 2012

History and Post-memory in Contemporary Vietnamese Literature Cole, C. & Berry, M. TEXT: Journal of Writing and Writing Programs 10 Special Issue 2011

Review of "Murdering Stepmothers - The Execution of Martha Rendell" by Anna Haebich Studies in Western Australian History #27 2011

The Program Era: Review by Catherine Cole Text 15 #2 2011

Literary Communities: writers’ practices and networks Cole, C. & Nelson, A. Strange Bedfellows or Prefect Partners Papers: Refereed Conference Papers of the 15th Annual AAWP Conference. Australia: Australian Association of Writing Programs, 2010

Writing in the Contemporary Academy 2009 Second Nature: International Journal of Creative Media #1

Fashion in Fiction: Text and Clothing in Literature, Film and Television 2009 McNeil, P., Karaminas, V. & Cole, C., eds.

Learning to Write 2009 Griffith Review #26 Summer

Homecoming and a Hard Climb 2008 The Weekend Australian

S & M Thriller Needs Fleshing Out 2008 The Weekend Australian

How the University Workshop Hinders New Writers from Engaging with Ideas (And what to do about it) 2007 Segue: Writing on Writing: July

Postcard from a Paris Dawn 2007 Australian Author 39 #2

Teaching James Joyce in the Creative Writing Workshop 2007 Eureka Studies in Teaching Short Fiction Vol.7 #2

Henry James, Affect and the Writer/Researcher 2006 Text 10 #2

A Tale of Two Cities 2005 Australian Author 37 #2

The Third and Fourth Countries 2005 Griffith Review #6 Summer

Research 2002 Crime Factory #6

I Wish I'd Written That 2001 Crime Factory #3

Other works
The Perfume River: An Anthology of Writing from Vietnam

Travelling Partners: Using Literary Studies to Support Creative Writing about Real Spaces Conference of the Australian Association of Writing Programs. Eds. Brien D., Cole C., & Freiman M. (Lobb, J.)

McNeil, P., Karaminas, V. & Cole, C. Fashion in Fiction: Text and Clothing in Literature, Film and Television.

Radio 
The Road to Austinmer Beach 2014 June BBC Radio Four

Residences 
 2015 Inaugural Visiting Writing Fellow, Sun Yat-Sen University, Guangzhou, China
 2008 Visiting Fellow, University of East Anglia, United Kingdom
 2002 Writer in Residence, Keesing Studio, Cite International des Arts, Paris,France
 2001 Asialink Fellow, The Gioi Publishing, Hanoi, Vietnam

References

External links 
 Catherine Cole: writer of fiction & non-fiction: about

1950 births
Living people
Australian writers
Academic staff of the University of Wollongong
Academic staff of RMIT University
Academic staff of the University of Technology Sydney